Bialla Rural LLG is a local-level government (LLG) of West New Britain Province, Papua New Guinea. The Lower dialect of the Ata language is spoken in the LLG.

Wards
01. Baia
02. Noau
03. Ubili
04. Navo
05. Lolobau
06. Kambaia
07. Barema
08. Wilelo
09. Apupul
10. Bialla
11. Tiauru
12. Sale / Malasi
13. Sale / Sege
14. Uasilau
15. Silanga
16. Pasusu
17. Ubae / Bilomi
18. Mangaseng
82. Bialla Urban

References

Local-level governments of West New Britain Province